Henry Holmes (11 November 1833 – 6 January 1913) was an English first-class cricketer. Holmes was a right-handed batsman who bowled right-arm roundarm medium. Holmes also played as an occasional wicketkeeper.

First-class career
Holmes made his first-class debut for Hampshire in 1861 against the Marylebone Cricket Club at Lord's, where on debut Holmes took figures of 8/82. Holmes continued playing county matches for Hampshire until the formation of Hampshire County Cricket Club in 1863 and their elevation to first-class status in the 1864 season.

Holmes made his first-class debut for Hampshire County Cricket Club in 1864 against Sussex. Holmes represented Hampshire in 27 first-class matches from 1864 to 1878, with his final appearance for the county coming in 1878 against Derbyshire at the Antelope Ground, Southampton. In his 27 matches Holmes scored 692 runs at a batting average of 15.04, with three half centuries and a high score of 71 against Sussex in 1864. With the ball Holmes took 22 wickets at a bowling average of 29.90, with a single five wicket haul and best figures of 5/57 against Derbyshire in 1876. In the field Holmes took 11 catches for Hampshire.

In addition to playing first-class matches for Hampshire, Holmes also made single first-class appearances for the Players of the South, for whom he hit a half century career high score of 77. In addition Holmes also appeared for the South of England, United England Eleven and the United South of England Eleven.

Holmes played a total of 32 first-class matches, scoring 798 runs at a batting average of 14.77, with four half centuries and a high score of 77. Holmes took a total of 28 wickets at a bowling average of 27.21, with two five wicket hauls and best figures of 5/57. An able fielder, Holmes took 14 catches and made a single stumping.

Umpiring career
Holmes also stood as a first-class Umpire from 1877 to 1899, with his final match standing as an Umpire between Kent and Surrey in the 1899 County Championship.

Death
Holmes died at Southampton, Hampshire on 6 January 1913. He was buried alongside his wife Harriet at St. Mary's Church, Eling near Southampton.

External links
Henry Holmes at Cricinfo
Henry Holmes at CricketArchive
Matches and detailed statistics for Henry Holmes

1833 births
1913 deaths
People from Romsey
English cricketers
Hampshire cricketers
North v South cricketers
United All-England Eleven cricketers
United South of England Eleven cricketers
English cricket umpires
Players of the South cricketers